Complete Madness is the first greatest hits album by ska/pop group Madness. It was released in 1982 and included Madness' biggest hits from their first three studio albums and the stand-alone singles. Complete Madness spent 99 weeks on the UK charts, peaking at number 1.

Content
This compilation includes the original 7-inch single mixes of most tracks (House of Fun being an exception). The vinyl and initial CD releases have shortened fade-outs for many tracks, to reduce the running time of each side of the original LP version. The first time the songs appeared in full for this compilation was on the 2003 Virgin CD reissue.

The original Australian version of the album, issued some months later than in the UK, replaces In the City with 13th UK single Driving in My Car.

Music video
An accompanying video cassette was also released, containing all thirteen of the group's music videos up to that point (the twelve UK singles plus Bed and Breakfast Man, which was a single in Canada), with specially filmed introductions to each video, together with the car commercials the band had done for Honda in Japan.

Track listing
The following track listing is for the original 1982 UK release (Stiff Records, HIT-TV1).

Personnel 
Madness
Graham "Suggs" McPherson – vocals
Mike Barson – keyboards, harmonica, vibraphone, marimba, tubular bells
Chris Foreman – guitars
Chas Smash – vocals, trumpet
Lee Thompson – saxophones, vocals
Mark Bedford – bass
Dan Woodgate – drums, percussion

Production
Clive Langer – producer
Alan Winstanley – producer

Chart performance

Certifications and sales

References

External links

1982 greatest hits albums
Albums produced by Alan Winstanley
Albums produced by Clive Langer
Madness (band) compilation albums
Madness (band) video albums
Stiff Records compilation albums